Alberta Innovates (AI) is an Alberta government provincial corporation whose appointed Board of Directors is accountable to the Minister of Jobs, Economy and Innovation and is responsible for promoting innovation in the province. AI was created from a variety of predecessor research and development organizations including the Alberta Research Council, the Alberta Heritage Foundation for Medical Research and the Alberta Energy Research Institute.

History

Scientific and Industrial Research Council of Alberta (SIRCA) 
In the early 1900s, Henry Marshall Tory, the first president of the University of Alberta, lobbied the Alberta government to create an organization to promote research and development (R&D) in the province.

In 1921, the government created the Scientific and Industrial Research Council of Alberta (SIRCA). SIRCA was the first provincial R&D organization in Canada. SIRCA's initial mandate was "[support] industries in developing new research, [map] out Alberta’s geological resources and [discover new commercial uses for things Alberta produced." Tory was the first chairman of SIRCA. SIRCA's mandate was to support economic development through applications of scientific and engineering expertise and, in the process, improve life in rural and urban Alberta. It would document Alberta's resources for industry through technical divisions such as fuels, road materials and a geological survey.

Notably, Tory recruited a chemist, Karl Clark, as the first full-time research professor to lead SIRCA's road-building research division. Clark's research focused on the potential to use bitumen as a paving material and eventually lead to the development of the Alberta oil sands. The City of Edmonton honored Clark as an Edmontonian of the Century for his process to separate oil from oilsands which is still in use today and for the impact it made to Edmonton who benefits from northern projects.

During this period, SIRCA also completed the first geological survey of Alberta.

Research Council of Alberta (RCA) 
In 1930, the organization was renamed the Research Council of Alberta. However, during the Great Depression, the province cut all funding for the organization and was instead supported by funds from the University of Alberta and the National Research Council.

In 1943, the province began funding the organization again to help continue research on Alberta's oil sands with other areas also being researched with less support.

Alberta Research Council (ARC) 
In 1981, the RCA was renamed again to the Alberta Research Council (ARC) and expanded its research focus beyond Alberta's oil sands. The organization also opened a new state-of-the-art research facility and headquarters in Edmonton in 1986.

Alberta Innovates (AI) 
In January 2010, the provincial government merged ARC and other research and development organizations including the Alberta Heritage Foundation for Medical Research and the Alberta Energy Research Institute to form a set of Alberta Innovates (AI) companies. This new set of companies included four corporations: AI Technology Futures, AI Health Solutions, AI Energy and Environment Solutions, and AI Bio Solutions.

On November 1, 2016, AI consolidated the four corporations into one singular Alberta Innovates company with two subsidiaries: C-FER Technologies and InnoTech Alberta.

In 2021, Alberta Innovates marked its 100-year centennial.

References 

Technology companies of Canada
Research institutes in Canada
Canadian companies established in 1921
1921 establishments in Alberta
Companies based in Edmonton